Shooting Straight is a 1930 American pre-Code crime drama film, directed by George Archainbaud and starring the early RKO staple Richard Dix and Mary Lawlor. The screenplay was written by J. Walter Ruben, from Wallace Smith's adaptation of a story by Barney A. Sarecky (the producer's brother). It was one of the films that earned a positive return for RKO that year, turning a profit of $30,000.

Plot
Larry Sheldon is a gambler, who learns that a friend of his has been murdered by a local gangster, Spot Willis. When he goes to confront Spot, a melee ensues in which Spot winds up dead. Thinking that he is responsible for the death, Sheldon flees the city aboard a train, with his companion, Chick.  They share a Pullman compartment with an itinerant minister, Mr. Walters, whose wallet Chick unobtrusively removes from his pocket.  When Sheldon discovers the theft, he chastises Chick and is determined to return the pilfered purse to its rightful owner.  However, before he can, the train is involved in a serious accident, in which Sheldon is knocked unconscious.

When he awakes, Sheldon is in the home Reverend Powell, where he is recuperating.  Due to his possession of Walters' wallet, the Reverend believes Sheldon to be the evangelist, a mistake which Sheldon does not correct, thinking that it will help him hide from the authorities.  Sheldon, as time passes, begins to fall in love with the Reverend's daughter, Doris.  He also begins to take the role of evangelistic minister seriously as well.

Things come to a head when the Reverend's son, Tommy, loses a significant amount of money to a local gambler, Martin.  When Sheldon goes to Tommy's rescue, he is recognized by Martin, who calls in the police.  In the events that follow, however, the truth is revealed that Sheldon did not actually kill Spots when another man confesses to the murder.  Free from criminal charges, Sheldon and Doris begin a life together, with Sheldon continuing as an aspiring minister, but this time under his real name.

Cast
Richard Dix as Larry Sheldon
Mary Lawlor as Doris Powell
James Neill as Reverend Powell
Mathew Betz as Martin
George Cooper as Chick
William Janney as Tommy Powell
Robert E. O'Connor as Hagen
Clarence Wurtz as Stevens
Eddie Sturgis as Spike
Richard Curtis as Butch
(cast list according to AFI database)

Reception
While it was not a huge hit, the film was one of RKO's films that year that did show a small profit, netting $30,000.

Notes
The story upon which this film was based was written by Barney Sarecky, the brother of the film's producer.

The film is known as A Colpo Sicuro in Italy.

References

External links
 

1930 crime drama films
1930 films
American black-and-white films
Films directed by George Archainbaud
American crime drama films
1930s American films
1930s English-language films